Hockeyland a 2022 American documentary film directed by Tommy Haines and produced by Northland Films, immerses audiences deep in the heart of Minnesota’s North Country, where hockey is just as central to life as football was to the fictional town of Dillon, Texas, and the frozen surface that separates every teenage boy from the man they hope to become one day is criss-crossed with red and blue lines. The film opened theatrically as the #1 documentary in the country for the week of September 9 and was a 2022 Critics Choice nominee for "Best Sports Documentary".

Synopsis
Minnesota is the heartland of US hockey, creating more skaters-on the local rinks and in the NHL-than any other state. Here, the senior boys of rival towns-one an emerging dynasty, the other with a fabled past-face down uncertain futures as they skate for a last chance to etch their names into local lore. Where Texas football has Friday Night Lights, Minnesota high school hockey has Hockeyland.

Reception

David Ehrlich, IndieWire's Chief Film Critic, calls the film "raw and brutally absorbing...and as fresh as a newly Zamboni-ed sheet of ice."  ESPN'''s Greg Wyshinski describes the film as "a fascinating look at Minnesota High School Hockey." Alex Mitchell of the New York Post expounds the film "captures a way of life like no other" Bruce Miller, film critic for the Sioux City Journal, praises the film as "one of those documentaries that sets the bar for others." MSP Magazine'' writer Steve Marsh says "Hockeyland transcends its genre: this is more than a hockey movie, this is drama."

References

External links

Official trailer

2020s documentary films
Ice hockey films
2022 documentary films